Caleb Demond Mills (born July 24, 2000) is an American college basketball player for the Florida State Seminoles of the Atlantic Coast Conference (ACC). He previously played for the Houston Cougars.

High school career
Mills attended Asheville Christian Academy in Swannanoa, North Carolina. As a junior, he travelled with his team to a tournament in the Canary Islands, averaging 25.3 points per game in three games and earning tournament MVP honors. Mills was also named to the All-Southeast Super Region Team. For his senior year, he transferred to T. C. Roberson High School in Asheville, North Carolina, where he did not play basketball, to graduate a semester early. Mills competed for PSB Elite on the Amateur Athletic Union circuit. On August 6, 2018, he committed to playing college basketball for Houston over offers from Clemson, Florida State, Georgia Tech, Tennessee and Wake Forest, among others. Mills was considered a four-star recruit by ESPN and Rivals, ranked the No. 117 recruit in his class and sixth in North Carolina. Head coach Kelvin Sampson called him the best offensive player he had ever recruited to Houston.

College career
Mills joined Houston at the semester break in January 2019, following his early high school graduation. He sat out his first season as a redshirt but practiced with the team and against backcourt starters Corey Davis Jr., Galen Robinson Jr. and Armoni Brooks. On February 19, 2020, Mills scored a freshman season-high 27 points, including 22 in the second half, in a 76–43 win over Tulsa. He scored his team's first 19 points of the second half. As a freshman, he mainly came off the bench and averaged a team-high 13.2 points per game, earning Second Team All-American Athletic Conference (AAC) and AAC All-Rookie Team honors. Mills became the first Houston freshman to make the all-conference first or second team since Clyde Drexler, while joining Rob Williams as the only freshmen in program history to lead their team in scoring. He was named preseason AAC Player of the Year before his sophomore season. Mills suffered an ankle injury early in the season and came off the bench through four games. On January 5, 2021, he transferred from Houston.

On January 12, 2021, Mills transferred to Florida State.

Career statistics

College

|-
| style="text-align:left;"| 2018–19
| style="text-align:left;"| Houston
| style="text-align:center;" colspan="11"|  Redshirt
|-
| style="text-align:left;"| 2019–20
| style="text-align:left;"| Houston
| 31 || 7 || 22.5 || .385 || .365 || .753 || 2.6 || 1.1 || .5 || .2 || 13.2
|-
| style="text-align:left;"| 2020–21
| style="text-align:left;"| Houston
| 4 || 0 || 19.0 || .448 || .250 || 1.000 || 1.3 || .3 || 1.3 || .0 || 9.8
|-
| style="text-align:left;"| 2021–22
| style="text-align:left;"| Florida State
| 26 || 23 || 26.3 || .433 || .353 || .855 || 2.4 || 2.4 || 1.5 || .5 || 12.7
|- class="sortbottom"
| style="text-align:center;" colspan="2"| Career
| 61 || 30 || 23.9 || .408 || .358 || .809 || 2.4 || 1.6 || 1.0 || .3 || 12.7

References

External links
Florida State Seminoles bio
Houston Cougars bio

2000 births
Living people
American men's basketball players
Basketball players from North Carolina
Florida State Seminoles men's basketball players
Houston Cougars men's basketball players
People from Arden, North Carolina
Point guards
Shooting guards